The 44th Quebec general election is scheduled to take place on or before October 5, 2026, to elect the members of the National Assembly of Quebec. Under the province's fixed election date law, passed in 2013, "the general election following the end of a Legislature shall be held on the first Monday of October of the fourth calendar year following the year that includes the last day of the previous Legislature", setting the date for October 5, 2026. However, the act does not fetter the discretion of the Lieutenant Governor of Quebec to dissolve the legislature before that time, in accordance with the usual conventions of the Westminster parliamentary system.

Background
In the 2022 general election, the Coalition Avenir Québec increased its parliamentary majority, winning 90 seats. The Liberals, despite finishing fourth in the popular vote behind Québec solidaire and the Parti Québécois, remained the official opposition winning 21 seats. The Parti Québecois lost most of its remaining seats but managed to elect its previously seatless leader Paul St-Pierre Plamondon to a seat. The Conservatives increased their share of the vote to 13%; however, as their support was more spread out throughout Quebec, they did not gain any seats.

Timeline

2022
October 3: The Coalition Avenir Québec led by François Legault wins a second majority government in the 43rd Quebec general election.
October 27: Liberal MNA for Vaudreuil Marie Claude Nichols was expelled from caucus after declining the Transport Critic role. She will sit as an independent. 
November 7: Dominique Anglade resigns as the leader of the Quebec Liberal Party, triggering a leadership election to determine her successor.
November 10: LaFontaine MNA Marc Tanguay is named interim leader of the Quebec Liberal Party.
December 1: Former Liberal leader Dominique Anglade resigns as MNA for Saint-Henri–Sainte-Anne.

2023
March 13: The Saint-Henri—Sainte-Anne provincial by-election is held, with Québec solidaire's Guillaume Cliche-Rivard being elected MNA.

Opinion polls

Notes

References

Elections in Quebec
Future elections in Canada